WMFG-FM (106.3 FM) is a radio station licensed to Hibbing, Minnesota. The station serves the Hibbing area.  The station is currently owned by Midwest Communications.

Sister Stations
Midwest also owns six radio stations on the Iron Range: WMFG, WNMT, WTBX and WUSZ. All six stations share the same studio location at 807 W. 37th Street, Hibbing.

History
The station went on the air as WMFG-FM on 1980-04-15.  On 1987-08-05, the station changed its call sign to WMFG,

The station previously carried a classic hits format as "106.3 Classic Hits". On January 1, 2017, as the result of an acquisition by owner Midwest Communications, WMFG flipped to classic rock as a simulcast of KQDS-FM.

References

External links

Classic rock radio stations in the United States
Radio stations in Minnesota
Radio stations established in 1971
1971 establishments in Minnesota
Midwest Communications radio stations